Jason Norris (born 7 September 1972) is an Australian professional golfer.

In 2007, Norris won the New South Wales Open and the Western Australia PGA Championship when both were part of the Von Nida Tour.

Norris also won the 2010 Victorian Open.

He was runner-up at the 2012 New Zealand Open. In 2015, he was runner-up at the Maekyung Open.

Norris won the 2017 Fiji International by four strokes. In the final round, he had eight birdies and three bogeys. He entered the tournament ranked 1238th in the world.

Professional wins (4)

European Tour wins (1)

1Co-sanctioned by the Asian Tour and the PGA Tour of Australasia

Asian Tour wins (1)

1Co-sanctioned by the European Tour and the PGA Tour of Australasia

PGA Tour of Australasia wins (2)

1Co-sanctioned by the European Tour and the Asian Tour

Von Nida Tour wins (2)

Results in World Golf Championships

"T" = Tied

References

External links

Australian male golfers
PGA Tour of Australasia golfers
European Tour golfers
Golfers from Melbourne
1972 births
Living people